Igor Igorevich Belyakov (born 25 April 1994) is a Russian football player. He plays for FC Khimik Dzerzhinsk.

Club career
He made his debut in the Russian Professional Football League for FC Sever Murmansk on 4 September 2013 in a game against FC Tosno.

He made his Russian Football National League debut for FC Olimpiyets Nizhny Novgorod on 8 July 2017 in a game against FC Avangard Kursk.

References

External links

1994 births
People from Kurgan, Kurgan Oblast
Sportspeople from Kurgan Oblast
Living people
Russian footballers
Association football forwards
FC Urozhay Krasnodar players
FC Volga Nizhny Novgorod players
FC Nizhny Novgorod (2015) players
FC Sever Murmansk players
FC Volga Ulyanovsk players
FC Khimik Dzerzhinsk players
Russian First League players
Russian Second League players